In British Columbia, eight counties are created in the "County Boundary Act". The counties are created for the administration of justice, and are not used in the administration of government.  Local government is organized by municipalities and by regional districts.

The counties are:
 County of Cariboo
 County of Kootenay
 County of Nanaimo
 County of Prince Rupert
 County of Vancouver
 County of Victoria
 County of Westminster
 County of Yale

Prior to 1895, the districts of the Province of British Columbia and its predecessors, the colonies of Vancouver Island and British Columbia, were separated into districts for county courts, supreme courts and shrievalties.  The Counties Definition Act of 1895 defined the divisions as the five original counties of Victoria, Vancouver, Westminster, Yale, Cariboo, and Kootenay. The act created procedure for the administration of justice including the appointment of registrars and sheriffs.

Sheriffs

Beginning in the colonial era, each county appointed its own high sheriff. Over the next century, duties of the county sheriff and his deputies ranged from tax collector to executioner. In 1974, the county sheriffs were amalgamated and became the British Columbia Sheriff Service.

County Court

Established in 1884, there existed in British Columbia a County Court, an intermediate court between the Provincial Court and the British Columbia Supreme Court. In 1990, the County Court of B.C. merged with the B.C. Supreme Court and its judges became justices of same. The B.C. Supreme Court now sits in eight judicial districts. The judicial districts of the B.C. Supreme Court have the same boundaries of the counties of the former County Court. This is the only current usage of "county" in British Columbia, which is a reference only to such court districts and has no similarity to the meaning in other provinces of Canada, the United States or United Kingdom.

See also
 County Boundary Act
 BC Government Dataset - County Areas Map

References

British Columbia law